During the Second World War Defence Regulations were a fundamental aspect of everyday life in the United Kingdom.

They were emergency regulations passed on the outbreak of war and during it to give the government emergency powers to prosecute the war. Two Acts of Parliament were passed as enabling legislation to allow the Defence Regulations to be promulgated. The first was the Emergency Powers (Defence) Act 1939, which was passed immediately before war was declared, and the second was the Emergency Powers (Defence) Act 1940, which was passed in the aftermath of the German attack on France in 1940. The 1940 Act allowed Defence Regulations to be made on matters such as industrial conscription.

The main Defence Regulations were the Defence (General) Regulations 1939, which were amended at various points throughout the war. Other Defence Regulations covered narrower fields of life. These included Defence Regulation 18B, which provided a framework for internment.

The Defence Regulations were Orders in Council and could amend any primary or secondary legislation within the limits of the enabling Acts to allow the effective prosecution of the war. Since the emergency conditions created by the war persisted after the conflict was over, the last of the Defence Regulations, mainly those on food rationing, were not abolished until the early 1950s.

Death penalty

Originally the regulations did not create any capital offences, since the law of treason was thought to be sufficient. Defence Regulation 2A provided that "If, with intent to assist the enemy, any person does any act which is likely to assist the enemy or to prejudice the public safety, the defence of the realm or the efficient prosecution of the war, he shall be liable to penal servitude for life."

However, in 1940 amendments to the regulations created two capital offences: "forcing safeguards" (breaking through roadblocks etc.) under regulation 1B, and looting under regulation 38A. A third new capital offence, called treachery, was created soon afterwards by the Treachery Act 1940.

Continuance and repeal
After the end of the war, the Defence Regulations were continued in force by the Supplies and Services (Transitional Powers) Act 1945, and later by the Emergency Laws (Transitional Provisions) Act 1946. The last significant Regulations to be in force before the passage of the Emergency Laws (Repeal) Act 1959 were:

 No. 55 (giving general power to control industry for wide purposes);
 No. 55AA, (empowering the Government to secure the necessary information for these purposes); and
 No. 55AB (giving power to impose price control of goods and services).

Under the terms of the 1959 Act, the last of the Defence Regulations expired on 31 December 1964.

See also
Capital punishment in the United Kingdom

References

Emergency laws
United Kingdom home front during World War II
United Kingdom military law
World War II legislation